James Workman was an Australian actor and writer. He worked in South Africa before going to Australia.

Selected publications
Reflections in Dark Glasses (1960) – writer
In Writing (1961) – actor
Sin in Hong Kong (1965) – Horwitz Publications – author
Dragon Ships (1965) – Horwitz Publications – author
Motel (1967) – writer
Skippy – writer
The Long Arm (1970) – writer
The Tichborne Affair (1978) – writer

References

External links
James Workman at Austlit
James Workman at IMDb
James Workman at National Film and Sound Archive

Australian screenwriters
Possibly living people
Australian actors
Year of birth missing